, also known as "Gera Gera Po Song", is the debut single by the Japanese music group King Cream Soda, consisting of Maiko, Gerapper, and ZZROCK. Releasing on April 30, 2014, the song was used as the opening to the 2014 TV-series Yo-kai Watch up until the series' 36th episode, which aired on August 12, 2016. The Japanese version was written by Move's Mototaka Segawa and was performed by King Cream Soda; the English version was written by Mark Risley and David H. Steinberg and was performed by Peter Michail and Kathryn Lynn.

Multiple remixes and renditions of "Gera Gera Po" has been released by King Cream Soda and Level-5, the creators of the Yo-kai Watch franchise, such as  "Matsuribayashi de Geragerapo", and "Hatsukoi-tōge de geragerapō", "Gera Gera Po" was also included in King Cream Soda's 2015 album Bye Bye Geragerapo.

"Gera Gera Po" peaked at number 4 on Oricon's Singles Chart and was certified gold by the Recording Industry Association of Japan.

Background and release 
In Japanese, "Gera Gera Po" was performed by the music group King Cream Soda, and was their debut single.

In the song's chorus, the words "Gera Gera Po" are repeated multiple times, which composer and arranger Tomoki Kikuya stated was so that listeners could "easily get on the [song's] rhythm". Kikuya originally thought that "Gera Gera Po" wouldn't be popular among children due to it being creepy, stating that he "thought the kids would be scared and wouldn't listen to the song". Kikuya would later cite the creepiness as a reason for why the song became popular among children, thinking that Yo-kai Watch "cute" characters mixed well with the creepy melody. "Gera Gera" is a reference to the Japanese variety show Kyosen x Maebu Gebageba 90 Minutes!, which uses a similar sound after punch lines.

"Gera Gera Po" was used as the opening theme to the 2014 anime TV-series Yo-kai Watch, where it was used until the series' 36th episode. The single was released on DVD and CD on April 30, 2014 and was rereleased as an exercise song by the Japanese publishing company Takarajimasha on December 29, 2014. "Gera Gera Po" was later included in King Cream Soda's compilation album, Bye Bye Geragerapo, which released on July 22, 2015.

In the english dub of the anime, Gera Gera Po was used up until the series' 10th episode, where it began to alternate with an original theme song performed by Jeff "Swampy" Marsh, with the former playing on odd-numbered episodes, until the 18th episode where Jeffs original song became the sole opening song for the remainder of the dub.

Music video and choreography 
The song's music video was choreographed by Lucky Ikeda. The song's main dance requires performers to cross their arms in front of their chest in rhythm to the "gera gera", and then pointing their index fingers up at the "po". The dance was choreographed to be simple so that viewers and listeners could easily imitate it.

Legacy 
Multiple official remixes and renditions have been released of "Gera Gera Po", such as the Japanese opening to Yo-kai Watch 2: Bony Spirits, "Matsuribayashi de Geragerapo", which was used as the 4th Japanese opening to the Yo-kai Watch TV-series. In Yo-kai Watch: The Movie, the ending theme uses Gera Gera Po as a basis for most of the track, including excerpts from other songs in the franchise, including brief lyrics from the remixes, Hatsukoi-tōge de geragerapō and Matsuribayashi de Geragerapo. In the english version of the movie, the lyrics from Hatsukoi-tōge de geragerapō and Matsuribayashi de Geragerapo are omitted, due to the songs not being dubbed into english. However, the original version of Gera Gera Po  remained in the song, due to the song being dubbed. For the opening of the 4th mainline entry in the Yo-kai Watch video game series, Yo-kai Watch 4, a cover of "Gera Gera Po" by HardBirds was used.

A rhythm game spin-off in the Yo-kai Watch video game series titled after "Gera Gera Po", Yo-kai Watch: Gerapo Rhythm, was released for mobile devices exclusively in Japan on May 10, 2018. "Gera Gera Po" has also appeared in two other video games: Yo-kai Watch Dance: Just Dance Special Version as one of the 10 included songs, and Taiko no Tatsujin: Don to Katsu no Jikū Daibōken, where it was one of the songs the player could drum to.

Sales and reception 
"Gera Gera Po" peaked on the Oricon weekly singles chart at number 4 in the week of May 12, 2014. In total, the song made 52 appearances on the weekly charts. In October 2014, the song was certified gold by the Recording Industry Association of Japan, indicating over 100 thousand sales. "Gera Gera Po" was reported by Real Sound to have sold over 20 thousand copies in its first week of release. The song was later ranked as the 50th best-selling single in Japan of 2014 by Oricon, who reported 136 thousand sales. The song also appeared on the Billboard Japan Hot 100 chart, where it peaked at number 9. Due to its "unique" choreography and "catchy" rhythm, the song was hugely popular among children.

Destructoid Chris Carter described "Gera Gera Po" as an "always lovable" song; Sato of Siliconera thought that it wouldn't have been "strange" for "Gera Gera Po" to replace "Kimigayo" as the national anthem of Japan, due to its popularity.

Personnel 
Credits adapted from YouTube.

 Tomoki Kikuya – composer, arrangement
 Mototaka Segawa – Japanese songwriter
 Mark Risley – English songwriter
 David H. Steinberg – English songwriter
 King Cream Soda – Japanese vocals
 Peter Michail – English vocals
 Kathryn Lynn – English vocals
 Will Anderson – English voice director, mixing

Track listing

Charts

Certifications

Notes

References 

2014 songs
2014 debut singles
Anime songs
2014 YouTube videos
2015 YouTube videos
Yo-kai Watch